Eric John Fitzgibbon (27 August 1936 – 24 January 2015) was an Australian politician representing the Australian Labor Party.

Born in Taree, New South Wales, he attended the University of New England and became a teacher. He served on Cessnock City Council, and was mayor from 1981 to 1983. In 1984, he entered the Australian House of Representatives as the Labor member for Hunter. He held the seat until 1996, when he retired. He was succeeded by his son, Joel, who served as Minister for Defence. He died in 2015.
Eric's grandson, Lachlan Fitzgibbon, plays for the Newcastle Knights.

References

1936 births
2015 deaths
Australian Labor Party members of the Parliament of Australia
Members of the Australian House of Representatives for Hunter
Members of the Australian House of Representatives
University of New England (Australia) alumni
20th-century Australian politicians